Dingana angusta, the narrow-banded widow, is a butterfly of the family Nymphalidae. It is found in grasslands the eastern highlands from northern Eswatini to Mpumalanga and the Limpopo Province.

The wingspan is 60–65 mm for males and 56–62 mm for females. Adults are on wing from September to November (with a peak in October). There is one generation per year

The larvae probably feed on various Poaceae species, including Pennisetum clandestinum.

References

Satyrini
Butterflies described in 1996